Lăzărescu is a Romanian surname. Notable people with the surname include:

 Cezar Lăzărescu (1923−1986), architect and urban planner
 Marian Lăzărescu (born 1984), luger
 Nae Lăzărescu (1941−2013), actor and comedian
 Mr. Lazarescu, title character of the 2005 film The Death of Mr. Lazarescu

Romanian-language surnames
Patronymic surnames
Surnames from given names